Aloe citrea,  is a species of Aloe found in South Eastern Madagascar.

References

External links
 
 

citrea